The Water of the Hills (L'eau des Collines) is the collective name for two novels by Marcel Pagnol, Jean de Florette and Manon des Sources, both originally published in 1963 and first published in English in 1966, the latter translation under the title Manon of the Springs. The books are set in the hills of Provence near Marseille in Southern France in the early twentieth century, and together they tell a tale of deception, betrayal and revenge.  Manon des Sources was a Pagnol film released in 1952 for which he had also written the original screenplay, and he subsequently developed the two novels from his own 1952 film. The books were then remade as two separate films in 1986, Jean de Florette and Manon des Sources.

Plot summary

Jean de Florette is the story of ‘le bossu’, a hunchbacked former clerk in a tax office who inherits a farm in the hills above the fictional village of La Bastide in Provence and, together with his wife and young daughter, dreams of making his fortune by raising rabbits. However his intricate plans and hard work are constantly thwarted by a relentless drought and the deception of his neighbours, the Soubeyrans, two grasping and unprincipled farmers who block the farm's spring to trick the naïve newcomer out of his land. Their plans eventually succeed when Jean works himself to death and his widow is forced to sell the land to the Soubeyrans for a fraction of its value. Unfortunately for the farmers the dead man's daughter Manon sees them unblocking the spring which would have saved her father and vows revenge.

Manon of the Springs (Manon des Sources), which takes up the story several years later, is the tale of Jean de Florette's daughter Manon, now reduced to living in a cave with a local shepherd and his wife. After locating the source of the village water supply she exacts a suitable revenge, both on the Soubeyrans for the inadvertent death of her father and on the other inhabitants of the village for the mean spirited way they had treated her family and helped to drive her father to an early death. After the suicide of the younger Soubeyran, Manon is persuaded by the village schoolmaster (who has guessed what she had done) to unblock the spring. She does this just as a village religious procession is being planned to ask divine intervention to restore the water supply.

At the moment that the procession, led by the saint's image and the curé (and which Manon has joined), returns to the village, the water begins flowing again from the village fountain. At the same time, a stranger arrives in the village: an old flame of Manon's mother, from her old career as opera singer. The older couple marry, as does Manon and the schoolmaster. In a final ironic twist, it is revealed that the older Soubeyran, unknown to him until his last months of life, was the father of Jean de Florette. He dies at exactly the moment that Manon gives birth to a son (Soubeyran's great grandson), to whom his great-grandfather has left all of his property and considerable fortune.

Pagnol said that at the age of thirteen he had heard this story from a peasant who lived in the mountains above his parents' holiday home near Aubagne (and thus near the fictional La Bastide).

Film adaptations
Jean de Florette, directed by Claude Berri, starring Yves Montand, Gerard Depardieu and Daniel Auteuil. 
Manon des Sources, directed by Claude Berri, starring Yves Montand, Daniel Auteuil and Emmanuelle Béart. 
Manon des Sources, directed by Marcel Pagnol.

References

External links

1963 French novels
Novels set in Provence
French novels adapted into films
Works by Marcel Pagnol